Jizzle may refer to: 

 Jizzle (artist), Gambian Afropop singer
 Jizzle (book), by John Wyndham (1954)
 "Jizzle" (song), by Jeezy featuring Lil Jon (2010)